Bolbochaeta  is a genus of tachinid flies in the family Tachinidae.

References

Tachinidae
Taxa named by Jacques-Marie-Frangile Bigot